Gąsiorki  is a village in the administrative district of Gmina Morzeszczyn, within Tczew County, Pomeranian Voivodeship, in northern Poland.

For details of the history of the region, see History of Pomerania.

The village has a population of 185.

References

Villages in Tczew County